The following is a chronicle of events during the year 1972 in ice hockey.

National Hockey League
Art Ross Trophy as the NHL's leading scorer during the regular season: Phil Esposito  ]  
Hart Memorial Trophy: for the NHL's Most Valuable Player:  Bobby Orr
Stanley Cup -   The Boston Bruins defeated the New York Rangers in the 1975 Stanley Cup Finals
With the first overall pick in the 1972 NHL Amateur Draft, the expansion New York Islanders selected Billy Harris.

 With the first overall pick in the 1972 NHL Expansion Draft, the Atlanta Flames selected goaltender Phil Myre.

Canadian Hockey League
Ontario Hockey League:  J. Ross Robertson Cup.
Quebec Major Junior Hockey League:  won President's Cup (QMJHL) for the first time in team history
Western Hockey League:   President's Cup (WHL) for the first time in team history
Memorial Cup:

International hockey

Summit Series

World Hockey Championship

European hockey

Minor League hockey
AHL:   Calder Cup
IHL:   Turner Cup.

Junior A hockey

University hockey
 NCAA Division I Men's Ice Hockey Tournament

Deaths

Season articles

See also
1972 in sports

References